Andrei Gherman (4 October 1941 – 25 February 2021) was a Moldovan physician and politician who served as Minister of Health.

References

1941 births
2021 deaths
Moldovan physicians
Moldovan Ministers of Health